Afinogenov is a Russian surname. Notable people with the surname include:

Alexander Afinogenov, a Russian playwright
Denis Afinogenov, a Russian ice hockey player
Ekaterina Afinogenova, a Russian tennis player, sister of Maxim
Maxim Afinogenov, a Russian ice hockey player, brother of Ekaterina

References
 

Russian-language surnames